The Waitahanui River is a river in the North Island of New Zealand.

Location

The Waitahanui River is one of the three main rivers that flow into Lake Taupō (the others being the Tongariro River and the Tauranga Taupō River). The Waitahanui flows out of the foothills of the Kaimanawa Ranges and is crossed by State Highway 1 as the river passes through the township of Waitahanui, before entering Lake Taupō.

Fishing

The Waitahanui is a popular fishing stream. Rainbow trout run up the river in winter to spawn and brown trout enter the river in autumn. At times anglers stand shoulder to shoulder across the rivermouth, trying to catch trout as they move out of the lake, a formation nicknamed the 'Picket Fence'.

References

External links
 A map of the river

Rivers of Waikato
Taupō District
Rivers of New Zealand